Brazilian martial arts may refer to:

Brazilian jiu-jitsu, a martial art, combat sport, and a self-defense system that focuses on grappling and especially ground fighting
Capoeira, an Angolan and Brazilian martial art that combines elements of dance, acrobatics and music
Vale tudo (English: anything goes) are full-contact unarmed combat events, with a limited number of rules, that became popular in Brazil during the 20th century, later begin an influence to the development of MMA
Luta Livre, a self-defense martial-art mixture of Catch Wrestling and Judo, divided between Esportivo (Sports) and Vale Tudo (Anything goes) styles
Huka-huka, a form of indigenous folk wrestling practiced by the Yawalapiti people
Kombato, a self-defense Military Martial Art created for the Brazilian Armed Forces (Mainly used by the Brazilian Navy and Brazilian Marine Corps) and for bodyguards
Tarracá, a form of folk wrestling from the Brazilian northeast